Mohammad Ali (also romanized as Moḩammad ʿAlī) is a village in Sadat Rural District, in the Central District of Lali County, Khuzestan Province, Iran. At the 2006 census, its population was 34, in 5 families.

References 

Populated places in Lali County